Stephens Lake is a reservoir in the province of Manitoba in Canada north of Lake Winnipeg. The reservoir was created in 1971 by the Kettle Dam and received its official name of Stephens Lake in 1972.

The Kettle Generating Station, Long Spruce Generating Station, and Limestone Generating Station dams are located downstream on the Nelson River.  Gillam is located on the southeastern shore of the Lake. The lake and the town of Gillam are accessed by Manitoba Provincial Road 280.

References

Lakes of Manitoba